10: 1993–2003 – Ten Years Of is a compilation album by K's Choice released in 2003. It peaked at position 9 in the Belgian and at 73 in the Dutch album charts.

Track listing
All tracks written by Gert Bettens and Sarah Bettens.  All tracks remastered by Benjamin Bertozzi at Jet Mastering, Brussels, Belgium.

Note: Track 16, "Virgin State of Mind", was first heard on the Buffy the Vampire Slayer American television series when K's Choice appeared/performed on "Doppelgangland" – the 16th episode of the 3rd season, originally broadcast February 23, 1999, on The WB network.  The track was later included on the Buffy the Vampire Slayer: The Album soundtrack album, released October 19, 1999.

References

K's Choice compilation albums
2003 greatest hits albums
Sony Music Belgium compilation albums